Christian Sagartz (born 1981) is an Austrian politician of the Austrian People's Party (ÖPP) who has been serving as Member of the European Parliament since 2020.

Early life and education
Sagartz holds a BA in political science and a master's degree in political advice.

Political career
Sagartz holds several positions in Pöttsching: councillor (since 2002), vice-mayor (since 2007), and chairman of the town's party in 2006. He was the Burgenland chairman of Young People's Party from 2002 to 2008 and became chairman of the Mattersburg district chapter in 2010. He became a member of the Landtag on 25 October 2005.

Member of the European Parliament, 2020–present
Sagartz has been a Member of the European Parliament since 2020. In parliament, he has been serving on the Committee on Development (since 2020), its Subcommittee on Human Rights (since 2020) and the Committee on Employment and Social Affairs.

In addition to his committee assignments, Sagartz is a substitute member of the parliament's delegations to the EU-Albania Stabilisation and Association Parliamentary Committee; the EU-Montenegro Stabilisation and Association Parliamentary Committee; the ACP–EU Joint Parliamentary Assembly; and for relations with South Africa.

References

1981 births
MEPs for Austria 2019–2024
Austrian People's Party MEPs
Deputy mayors
People from Mattersburg District
Members of the Landtag of Burgenland
Austrian city councillors
Living people